Antoine Gallimard (born 19 April 1947 in Paris) is a French publisher and company boss, president of Éditions Gallimard and Groupe Madrigall.

Biography 
Antoine Gallimard is one of the four children of Claude Gallimard and Simone Gallimard, son and daughter-in-law of Gaston Gallimard, the founder of éditions Gallimard in 1911. Antoine Gallimard has four daughters including Charlotte (1980–), appointed CEO of Casterman in November 2012.

Claude Gallimard succeeded his father, Gaston Gallimard, at the head of Éditions Gallimard in 1975. Antoine Gallimard was entrusted in 1988 by his father to take the reins of the publishing group after the eldest son and designated heir, Christian Gallimard, left after a major disagreement with his father in 1984. In spite of his youth and his relative lack of experience, Antoine Gallimard (who had thought of becoming a professor of philosophy, and whose father had forcibly steered him towards the Faculty of Law in Assas) imposed himself and succeeded in bringing out Gallimard of the family conflict in which they had almost foundered.

In 2000, after considering buying the electronic publishing company Bibliopolis, he abruptly put an end to this project. On 5 January 2003, Antoine Gallimard announced that he and his close associates in the holding company Groupe Madrigall now owned 98% of the family business, following the repurchase of minority shareholders. In February 2011, in an interview with Télérama, he explained the state of the company, a hundred years after its creation:

He is president of the "Association pour le développement de la librairie de création" (ADELC).

Distinctions 
 Commandeur of the Legion of Honour.
 Récipiendaire de la Creu de Sant Jordi Award.

References

Bibliography 
 Gallimard, un éditeur à l'œuvre, Alban Cerisier, coll. "Découvertes Gallimard" (#569), éditions Gallimard, 2011.
 Le Roman du XXe siècle, in Nouvelle Revue Française #596, February 2011.

External links 
 Site of the éditions Gallimard
 Antoine Gallimard on YouTube
 Antoine Gallimard on France Culture
 Antoine Gallimard justifie la réorganisation de sa maison d'édition on Le Parisien (3 July 2015)
 Antoine Gallimard : Nos auteurs ne sont pas si mal payés ! on Bibliobs (19 April 2014)

1947 births
Living people
Businesspeople from Paris
Commandeurs of the Légion d'honneur
French chief executives
French publishers (people)
Nouvelle Revue Française editors
Antoine